Too Bright, Just Right, Good Night is an album by Actionslacks, released in 1996.

Track listing
(all songs written by Actionslacks, lyrics by Tim Scanlin)
"Sporting Life"
"Clockwatcher"
"No Wonder Boy"
"I'm Hit!"
"Spelling Bee"
"Floater"
"Heavy"
"Space-Age Heart"
"Tugboat Mutiny"
"A.C.R.O.N.Y.M."
"Blues in the Way"
"Saint"
"Crook"
"In Hysterics"
"Louder"
"Credits"

Personnel
Tim Scanlin - guitar, vocals
Marty Kelly - drums
Mark Wijsen - bass

References 

1996 albums